Semmelweis University (Hungarian: Semmelweis Egyetem) is a research-led medical school in Budapest, Hungary, founded in 1769. With six faculties and a doctoral school it covers all aspects of medical and health sciences.

The university is also the largest provider of health care services in Hungary. Most of the departments cater for the most serious cases and patients requiring complex treatment.

As the highest listed institution in Hungary in the 2023 Times Higher Education World University Rankings, Semmelweis University is among the top 250 universities in the world.

History 
The University of Trnava, founded in 1635, was lacking medical training for a long time, so Hungarian doctors were only able to study at foreign universities or in private schools, and surgeons were trained in guilds. Maria Theresa’s court physician, following the Empress’s decree of 7 November 1769, developed the plan of the new faculty, on the basis of the Vienna model. In 1770, education began with five departments. 

In 1777 the university, and thus medical education, moved to Buda, and in 1784, following Joseph II’s personal decree, to the other side of the Danube: to Pest. The rapidly developing Pest provided a wider range of ‘patient material’, and the departments also multiplied. There was space for a botanical garden, and anatomy as well actual patient care could also be taught more effectively. 

At the end of the 19th century the establishment of the present theoretical institutes and clinical departments started. Those buildings in Budapest are still in use after reconstruction and modernization. During the 20th and 21st centuries new clinics and institutes were built. 

From 1951, the Faculty of Medicine continued as an independent medical school and in 1955, Faculties of Dentistry and Pharmaceutical Sciences were incorporated into the new medical University. In 1969, it adopted the name of its most famous professor, Ignáz Semmelweis.

Semmelweis University was the first Hungarian higher educational institution, which started to offer an international program at the Faculty of Medicine in German in 1983, while its international program in English started in 1987, at the Faculties of Medicine, Dentistry and Pharmaceutical Sciences.

From 1 August 2021, the founder’s, owner’s and operator’s rights of Semmelweis University are exercised by the Foundation for National Health Care and Medical Education following the model change in higher education.

Faculties
Semmelweis University is a specialised university offering undergraduate and graduate courses only in the field of health sciences. The university has around 10,000 students from 60 nations, with foreign students accounting for about 18% of the total community. The largest and oldest faculty of the university is the Faculty of Medicine with 4,500 students accounting for 40% of the total number of students.

 András Pető Faculty
 Faculty of Dentistry
 Faculty of Health and Public Services
 Faculty of Health Sciences
 Faculty of Medicine
 Faculty of Pharmaceutical Sciences
 School of Ph.D. Studies

Academics
Education takes place in six faculties and three languages (Hungarian, English and German). Nearly 11,000 students are taking courses in One-tier Master Programmes and at Bachelor, Master's and Postgradual levels and 1,500 of them are granted a diploma each year.

Integrated master programs (one-tier master programs)
Medicine, Dentistry and Pharmacy run as one-tier master programs (integrated master) with a degree awarded at the end of five years of study in Dentistry and Pharmacy and six years in Medicine. These courses are one-tier degree courses, without intermediate exit, and are in alternative to the two-tier degree course scheme.

Courses in Medicine, Dentistry and Pharmacy are available in Hungarian, English and German.

Bachelor’s programs
Bachelor's Programs of Semmelweis University are offered at the Faculty of Health Sciences and at Pető andrás Faculty. The length of the programs is 8 semesters (4 years) with a total of 240 credit points.

The following Bachelor's programs are available in English:

 Physiotherapy 
 Nursing 
 Midwifery 
 Dietetics 
 Medical diagnostic analysis – Optometry  
 Public health supervisor 
 Health care management
 Conductive education (Pető method)

The physiotherapy program is available in Italian within the framework of the university's off-campus program run in Lugano, Switzerland.

Master's programs
Master's programs are offered at the Faculty of Health and Public Services and the Faculty of Health Sciences. The length of the programs is 3 semesters (1.5 years) with a total of 90 credit points.

The following Master's Programs are available in English at the Faculty of Health Sciences:

 Physiotherapy
 Nursing

Postgraduate education
Semmelweis University's School of Ph.D. Studies has 7 Doctoral Schools: Basic Medicine, Clinical Medicine, Pharmaceutical Sciences, Mental Health Sciences, Neurosciences, Molecular Medicine and Pathological Sciences. Each school comprises 2 to 17 study programs that add up to over 40 programs. The Doctoral School of Semmelweis University integrates the research groups and programs of all Faculties entitled to issue Ph.D. degrees. The Doctoral School of Semmelweis University has around a hundred students obtaining their Ph.D. diplomas every year. The degrees are recognized by the European Union and are accepted in other countries.

Research

Research, development, and innovation at Semmelweis University take place in the areas of living natural sciences, and social sciences. Within these, life science R&D activities are the most prominent. The scientific areas connected to the Ph.D. programme are theoretical, clinical, molecular and multidisciplinary medicine, pharmaceutical sciences, mental health sciences, and pathological sciences. Physical science research is limited to certain segments of theoretical medicine and social science research is employed in the areas of mental health.

R&D and training are incorporated into clinical and health sciences as well as into the university's educational activities and the curriculum. They are also included in the specialised networks operating at the university (e.g. nanotechnology, bioimaging, genomics, biobank), as well as in the research university modules (diagnostics, technology, therapy, prevention) and the collaborations which have been developing within these areas.

Semmelweis University's collection of academic journals comprises printed material, online resources (databases, full text e-journals, e-books, etc.) that may be accessed both on-campus and off-campus. The Central Library provides access to more than 5,000 full text e-journals and specialised databases through its website.

Patents connected to the University include the iKnife, a surgical device that is able to tell healthy and cancerous tissues apart immediately after the first cut, or the virtual 3D microscope, a device equipped with a microscope slide scanner able to scan 300 slides in one run and a 3D viewer that creates a spatial reconstruction of the serial specimen.

The university publishes the peer-reviewed journal  (Kaleidoscope: Journal on the History of Culture, Science and Medicine) , which is rated ERIH PLUS by the European Reference Index for the Humanities and Social Sciences.

International relations
Semmelweis University has a network of international partner agreements with around a hundred universities within the Erasmus+ network and 40 further universities in joint cooperation based on bilateral agreements.

Off-campus programs
The university operates cross-border programs allowing foreign students to follow the Semmelweis curriculum while undertaking their studies at the partner institution abroad. Venues of Semmelweis University's off-campus programs including Asklepios Kliniken in Hamburg, Libera Università degli Studi in Lugano, and the Health Management Academy in Bratislava.

International joint projects
Semmelweis University runs research and student exchange programmes in collaboration with several universities abroad based on bilateral agreements. The programmes offer scholarships to students with outstanding academic results and staff to study or do research at the partner institutions. The programmes are based on reciprocity and the length of exchange programmes may vary from one week to three  months. Partner institutions include Jacobs School of Medicine and Biomedical Sciences, University of California Davis School of Medicine, Rutgers University, Medical University of Innsbruck, Saitama Medical University, University of Freiburg, Heidelberg University, University of Ulm, University of Padua, University of Trieste, and Jessenius Faculty of Medicine at Comenius University.

Academic ranking
As of 2022, the university's pharmacy programme was ranked at 200 by the QS World University Rankings.

In the 2022 Times Higher Education World University Rankings Semmelweis University was placed between 250 and 300.

Buildings and sites
The university does not have a campus. Instead, its faculties, departments, hospitals, clinics, libraries, sport and accommodation facilities are scattered throughout the capital city Budapest. Some facilities are clustered, and most of its clinical departments belong to one of the three clinical blocks.  

The university's Theoretical Building at Nagyvárad tér is the tallest high rise in Hungary. It houses several research institutions, a student centre, the office of the Students’ Union, auditoriums, conference halls and the country's largest stained glass installations.

The previously fragmented Faculty of Health Sciences was united in 2003 in the newly renovated Art Nouveau building of a former sanatorium. The faculty's building houses clinical skills laboratories and contains various social spaces for students to use, such as an atrium with couches and a garden.

The Dental Clinical and Training Centre was completed in 2007, accommodating clinics and institutions.

The Basic Medical Science Centre was built in 2008. Over a third of its area is used for scientific research, and it also has auditoriums and smaller lecture halls. The building is also home to several research groups that participate in international collaborations.

The Inner Clinical Block is located close to the Corvin-negyed metro station and contains the main building and some of the university's hospitals. The main building houses the Rector's Office, the Deans’ Offices and other organisational and administrative units, as well as Semmelweis Salon, a venue for scientific symposia.

Administration 
The main governing body of Semmelweis University is the Senate, with the rector as its president. It is endowed with the authority to make decisions and recommendations, to form opinions, and to supervise. The Senate determines the course of the university's educational and research activities and sees to their realisation, with due regard to the Founding Charter.

Leaders

The leadership of Semmelweis University consists of the Rector, responsible for educational and scientific affairs and the Chancellor, overseeing the financial matters of the university. The Rector is aided by five Vice-Rectors: the Vice-Rector for General Affairs, the Vice-Rector for Educational Affairs, the Vice-Rector for Science and Innovation, the Vice-Rector for Clinical Affairs and the Vice-Rector for Strategy and Development.

 Rector: Dr. Béla Merkely
 Chancellor: Dr. Lívia Pavlik
 Vice-Rector for General Affairs: Dr. Ferenc Bánhidy
 Vice-Rector for Educational Affairs: Dr. Péter Hermann
 Vice-Rector for Science and Innovation: Dr. Péter Ferdinandy
 Vice-Rector for Clinical Affairs: Dr. Attila Szabó
 Vice-Rector for Strategy and Development: Dr. Éva Szabó Feketéné
Vice-Rector for International Studies: Dr. Alán Alpár

Notable people
Ignác Semmelweis (1818–1865), popularly known as “the saviour of mothers”. He began his career in Vienna; it was there that he discovered the cause of puerperal fever. He left Vienna for the Medical Faculty of the Imperial and Royal University of Pest (now Semmelweis University), where he served as professor and director of the Department of Obstetrics and Gynaecology from 1855 to 1865.
Albert Szent-Györgyi (1893–1986) is the only Hungarian Nobel laureate who received the distinction for research conducted in Hungary. He earned his diploma at the medical faculty in Budapest (now Semmelweis University). He successfully isolated vitamin C and discovered the components and reactions of the citric acid cycle at the University of Szeged. Szent-Györgyi returned to the University of Budapest's Faculty of Medicine after the war, but emigrated to the US in 1947.
László Szollás (1907–1980), world champion and Olympic medalist pair skater. 
Judith Forrai (born 1949), Hungarian historian of science, medical historian, dentist, professor, doctor of the Hungarian Academy of Sciences, and journal editor-in-chief.
Zoltán Kovács (born 1962), vice-president of the Hungarian Ice Hockey Federation and Paul Loicq Award recipient, graduated with Master of Physical Education degree in 1992 at the Faculty of Physical Education and Sport Sciences.

Gallery

See also
List of universities and colleges in Hungary
Education in Hungary
Erasmus Programme
iknife
Ignaz Semmelweis
Albert Szent-Györgyi

References

External links

Spanish Representative of Semmelweis University
International Semmelweis Student Association (ISSA)

Medical schools in Hungary
Semmelweis University
Educational institutions established in 1769
1760s establishments in the Habsburg monarchy
18th-century establishments in Hungary
Universities and colleges in Hungary